Davisville Glacier is a glacier about  long which drains the north slopes of the Wisconsin Range, between Lentz Buttress and Moran Buttress, and trends northwestward to merge with the lower portion of the Horlick Ice Stream. It was mapped by the United States Geological Survey from surveys and U.S. Navy air photos, 1960–64, and was named by the Advisory Committee on Antarctic Names for Davisville, Rhode Island, the location of the Construction Battalion Center responsible for cargo matters for U.S. Navy Operation Deep Freeze on the east coast.

References 

Glaciers of Marie Byrd Land